Philip Jonathan Gbagu Palmer (born June 29, 1940) was a Sierra Leonean diplomat.

Career 
In 1970 he was appointed First Sierra Leonan Ambassador to Addis Ababa, Ethiopia and was represented Sierra Leone before ihe Organisation of African Unity and the United Nations Economic Commission for Africa
In 1971 he was first Sierra Leonan non resident Ambassador to Tel Aviv, Israel.
On  he was appointed Ambassador to Washington, D.C., where he was accredited from   til  and concurrently commissioned as High Commissioner (Commonwealth) to Ottawa, Canada.

References

1940 births
Living people
Ambassadors of Sierra Leone to Ethiopia
Ambassadors of Sierra Leone to the United States
People from Port Loko District
Sierra Leonean expatriates in the United Kingdom
Fourah Bay College alumni